Three ships of the Brazilian Navy have been named  Rio Grande do Sul:

 , a  launched in 1909 and decommissioned in 1948
 Brazilian submarine Rio Grande do Sul (S11) (Balao class), the former American  USS Sand Lance (SS-381); in Brazilian Navy service, 1963–1972; cannibalized for spare parts and scrapped by 1975
 Brazilian submarine Rio Grande do Sul (S11) (Tench class), the former American  USS Grampus (SS-523); in Brazilian Navy service, 1973–1993

Brazilian Navy ship names